Yves Bonnardel (born 1967) is a French philosopher, essayist and editor, libertarian, egalitarian and antispeciesist activist. He is one of the founding members of the French-language journal Cahiers antispécistes ("Antispeciesist Notebooks") and of the events Veggie Pride, Les Estivales de la question animale ("The Summers of the Animal Question") and the march to close all slaughterhouses.

Biography 
Bonnardel was born in 1967, in a small town south of Lyon. His father was a secondary school teacher, who was highly involved in the French Maoist movement. He became a vegetarian at the age of 13. His father's choice of political engagement inspired Bonnardel to take a different path, turning to individualist anarchism and leaving school early with the intention to live in a community and train, before getting involved in activist causes. He became an activist against adult supremacy, before also taking up antispeciesism as a cause.

In May 1989, along with David Olivier and three other activists, he published Nous ne mangeons pas de viande pour ne pas tuer d'animaux ("We don't eat meat so we don't kill animals"), in response to discussions of vegetarianism in France. With David Olivier and Françoise Blanchon, in 1991, he founded the antispeciesist journal Cahiers antispécistes lyonnais (later renamed to Cahiers antispécistes). He was also one of the journal's editors, before leaving at some point during the 1990s.

In 1997, he co-wrote and distributed the Manifesto for the Abolition of International Apartheid with David Olivier.

Bonnardel co-founded Veggie Pride in 2001. He participates in the organization each year of the World Day for the Abolition of Meat, the World Day for the End of Fishing and the World Day for the End of Speciesism. Bonnardel is an editor of the antispeciesist French-language journal L'Amorce ("The Primer").

Philosophy 
Bonnardel is an antinaturalist and critical of the concept of nature, describing it as an "ideological tool", which places humans in a superior position of freedom, while other animals are seen as needing to obey natural cycles such as the food chain. He argues that animals are seen as existing only to perform certain ecosystem functions, such as a rabbit being food for a wolf. Bonnardel compares this with the religious concept of woman existing for the sake of man, or the slaves for their masters and argues that all individual animals have an interest in living. He is also critical of the concept of a balance of nature, stating "[w]hat we call balance, or order, in practice, it's chaos, it's nonsense". Bonnardel has also discussed the predation problem, seeing it as an issue that we should work towards solving.

Bonnardel is critical of humanism, describing it as a form of elitism centred on white men, arguing that "[h]umanism is racism, patriarchy, the education of children, slaughterhouses." He instead argues for egalitarianism.

Bonnardel is a hedonistic utilitarian, who advocates placing sentient individuals at the center of moral concern because they have desires, perceptions, emotions and a will of their own; he argues that from this follows a moral axiom "[o]ne must not harm a sentient being". Bonnardel was influenced by Peter Singer's Animal Liberation and is a supporter of Singer's conception of speciesism, seeing it as instrumental in deconstructing anthropocentric morality.

Publications

Books 
 La Domination adulte. L'oppression des mineurs ("Adult Domination. The Oppression of Minors"; Le Hêtre-Myriadis, 2015)
 with Thomas Lepeltier, Pierre Sigler (dir.), David Olivier and Estiva Reus. La Révolution antispéciste ("The Antispeciest Revolution"; PUF, 2018)
 with Axelle Playoust-Braure. Solidarité animale. Défaire la société spéciste ("Animal Solidarity: Defeating the Speciesist Society"; ed. La Découverte, 2020)

Pamphlets 
 Doing away with the concept of Nature, back to ethics and politics (Tahin Party, 2007)

References

External links 
 
 
 Complete bibliography
 Encounters with an Egalitarian: Yves Bonnardel (Documentary in French, with English subtitles)
 Ageism / Speciesism: Common Points? (video in French)
 Cahiers antispécistes

1967 births
Living people
20th-century French essayists
20th-century French philosophers
21st-century French essayists
21st-century French philosophers
French activists
French animal rights activists
French animal rights scholars
French anti-capitalists
French editors
French feminists
French libertarians
French male essayists
French political philosophers
French vegetarianism activists
Hedonism
Male feminists
Writers from Lyon
Utilitarians
Youth activists